John Pitt (c. 1727 – 14 July 1805) of Gloucester was an English attorney and politician.

Life
The son of James Pitt, he worked as a customs collector, attorney and steward on the estates of Philip Yorke, 1st Earl of Hardwicke. He was a Member (MP) for Gloucester 5 February 1789 to 14 July 1805. He came into parliament as the candidate of those who opposed the candidate of Charles Howard, 11th Duke of Norfolk, a Whig grandee; and reliably supported the administration of William Pitt the younger.

References

1727 births
1805 deaths
English lawyers
People from Gloucester
Members of the Parliament of Great Britain for English constituencies
British MPs 1784–1790
British MPs 1790–1796
British MPs 1796–1800
Members of the Parliament of the United Kingdom for English constituencies
UK MPs 1801–1802
UK MPs 1802–1806